The Woodlands High School is a public high school located in The Woodlands CDP in Montgomery County, Texas, and is a part of the Conroe Independent School District. A section of the Montgomery County portion of The Woodlands and unincorporated areas south of the city of Conroe are served by The Woodlands High School. In 2019, the school received an A grade from the Texas Education Agency.

Campuses
TWHS takes pupils in grades 9 to 12, divided between the two campuses:
 The Woodlands High School: grades 10–12
 The Woodlands High School Ninth Grade Campus (formerly Branch Crossing Junior High School): grade 9 

From 1976 until the opening of The Woodlands High School in 1996, McCullough High School served The Woodlands community. McCullough High School, named after J.L. McCullough, also housed seventh and eighth graders until Knox Junior High opened its doors in 1978. When The Woodlands High School opened on August 26, 1996, McCullough served The Woodlands community as a junior high school.  From 2000 to 2005, McCullough was known as The Woodlands High School: McCullough Campus, housing freshmen and sophomores.  Since 2005, with the opening of The Woodlands College Park High School, McCullough has once again served the community as a junior high school.

Demographics
In the 2018–2019 school year, The Woodlands High School had 4,345 students, including students at the 9th grade campus.
The ethnic distribution was:
(3.3%) were African-American
(24.6%) were Hispanic
(62.1%) were White
(0.2%) were American Indian
(6.6%) were Asian-American
(0.2%) were Pacific Islander
(3.0%) were Two or More Races

7.0% of students were eligible for free or reduced-price lunch.

Academics
In 1997–98, The Woodlands High School was named a Blue Ribbon School by the United States Department of Education.
For each school year, the Texas Education Agency rates school performance using an A–F grading system based on statistical data. For 2018–2019, the school received a score of 92 out of 100, resulting in an A grade. The school received a similar score of 93 the previous year.

The Woodlands High School was ranked 295 in Newsweek’s 2011 list of the Best High Schools in the United States. The school was ranked based on graduation rate, college matriculation rate, AP tests taken per graduate, average SAT/ACT scores, average AP scores, and AP courses offered. Newsweek has ranked the school among America's top 1,000 high schools on several occasions. Additionally, in its 2013 ranking of America's Best High Schools, U.S. News & World Report awarded a Gold Medal to The Woodlands High School. This means The Woodlands High School ranked among the top 500 schools nationally (out of 21,035 schools) using a College Readiness Index heavily weighted on success on Advanced Placement examinations. The Woodlands High School has also been awarded the University Interscholastic League Class 5A Lone Star Cup on five occasions (2006, 2008, 2009, 2010, and 2011). This award is intended to honor the best overall academic and athletic program in the state of Texas, as determined by success at UIL-sanctioned activities.

The Woodlands High School has a relatively extensive College Board Advanced Placement program that includes the following courses: Art History, Biology, Calculus AB and BC, Chemistry, Chinese Language and Culture, Computer Science A, English Language and Literature, Environmental Science, European History, French Language, German Language, Human Geography, Japanese Language and Culture, Macroeconomics, Music Theory, Physics C,  Psychology, Spanish Language, Statistics, Studio Art, U.S. History, U.S. Government & Politics, and World History.

Athletics
The Woodlands Highlanders compete in Swimming, Cross Country, Volleyball, Football, Basketball, Wrestling, Powerlifting, Soccer, Golf, Tennis, Track, Softball, Lacrosse, and Baseball.

In 2006, The Woodlands baseball team finished the season with a 38-1 record and won the Texas UIL 5A State Championship. They were also named National Champions by Baseball America. The 2006 team included future Major League Players Kyle Drabek and Paul Goldschmidt.

In 2011, The Woodlands softball team finished the season with a 44-1 record and won the Texas UIL 5A State Championship. They were also named National Champions by the National Fastpitch Coaches Association/USA Today and ESPN/Rise. The coaching staff was named NFCA National Coaching Staff of the year.

Due to the similarity of its red "W" logo, the University of Wisconsin threatened to bring legal action against TWHS, who agreed to phase out the logo.

State athletic titles
Baseball
2000 (5A), 2006 (5A), 2013 (5A)
Boys Cross Country
1999 (5A), 2000 (5A), 2003 (5A), 2004 (5A), 2006 (5A), 2007 (5A), 2008 (5A), 2009 (5A), 2010 (5A), 2015 (6A), 2016 (6A), 2017 (6A), 2018 (6A)
Girls Cross Country
2008 (5A)
Boys Golf
2002 (5A), 2005 (5A), 2012 (5A)
Girls Golf
2001 (5A), 2002 (5A), 2003 (5A)
Girls Soccer
2010 (5A)
Boys Swimming
1990, 1996, 1997, 1998, 1999, 2000, 2004 (5A), 2010 (5A), 2021 (6A)
Girls Swimming
1989, 1990, 1991, 1993, 2006 (5A), 2009 (5A), 2017 (6A), 2018 (6A), 2021 (6A)
Girls Softball
2011 (5A)
Girls Volleyball
2013 (5A), 2014 (6A)
Boys Track and Field
1999 (5A), 2017 (6A), 2018 (6A)

Band
The Woodlands High School Band was honored by the John Philip Sousa Foundation with the Sudler Flag of Honor in 2003 in recognition for excellence in a concert setting. The band was honored again by the John Philip Sousa Foundation in 2009 and 2018 with the Sudler Shield in recognition for excellence in marching band. This makes The Woodlands High School one of only a handful of high schools internationally to have received both the Sudler Flag and the Sudler Shield. In 2003 and 2012, The Woodlands High School's Wind Ensemble was invited to perform at The Midwest Clinic.  In 2012, the Wind Ensemble was named a National Winner in The Foundation for Music Education's National Wind Band Honors Project. Members of The Woodlands High School Band have placed in the TMEA All-State Bands and Orchestras every year since the school has opened.

In 2006, the band received first place in the class AAA Bands of America Grand National Championships semi-finals. In 2013, the band was named the Bands of America Grand National Champion, scoring a 96.8 and winning caption awards for Outstanding Music Performance and Outstanding General Effect. The band has been a UIL Marching Band state finalist in 2002, 2004, 2010, 2012, 2014, 2016, 2018, 2020, and 2022.

Extracurricular activities
The school offers more than 80 different clubs  and organizations. Students have the opportunity to participate in band, choir, speech, debate, drama, drill team, orchestra, cheerleading, and UIL academic activities.

In 2004, The Woodlands High School Winter Guard were the Winter Guard International Scholastic Open Class champions.

The Woodlands High School Theatre Department has succeeded in advancing to the state finals of the UIL One-Act Play contest six times, most recently in 2011, and won the state title in 2000.  The theatre department has also been invited to perform on the main stage of the International Thespian Festival four times. The department performed at Texas Thespian State Festival and International State Festival for the first time in December 2015 and June 2016 respectively with the musical, The 25th Annual Putnam County Spelling Bee. In 2003, the theatre department performed at the Edinburgh Festival Fringe.

The Woodlands High School Highsteppers were Grand National Champions in 2005.

Feeder patterns
Elementary schools (K-4) that feed into The Woodlands High School include:
Buckalew
Bush
Galatas
Glen Loch
Powell (excluding Harper's Landing).

Combined elementary and intermediate schools (K-6) include Deretchin and Coulson Tough.

Intermediate schools (5-6) include Mitchell and Wilkerson (Glen Loch ES zoning only).

McCullough Junior High School is the sole feeder junior high school (7-8) into The Woodlands High School.

Notable alumni
Kevin Abstract, Rapper and director, Brockhampton
 Danny Amendola, NFL player, Free agent
 Scott Atchison, professional baseball player
 Lance Blanks, former NBA player 
Bronson Burgoon, professional golfer
Patrick Carr, NFL player who is currently a free agent, graduated in 2015.
Kassidy Cook, Olympian diver
 Kyle Drabek, MLB player, Toronto Blue Jays 
 Tiffany Grant, anime voice actress
 Paul Goldschmidt, MLB player, St Louis Cardinals
 Jack Ingram, country singer 
 Larry Izzo, former NFL player  
 Daniel Lasco, NFL player, New Orleans Saints
 Stacy Lewis, LPGA Tour golfer, 2013 Women's British Open champion 
 Jeff Maggert, PGA Tour golfer 
 Rusty Pierce, former MLS player 
 Jameson Taillon, MLB player, Free Agent
Ameer Vann, Rapper, formerly of Brockhampton
Antoine Winfield Jr., NFL player, Tampa Bay Buccaneers
Drew Romo, MLB Player, Colorado Rockies

References

External links

The Woodlands High School
The Woodlands High School Band

Conroe Independent School District high schools
Educational institutions established in 1996
1996 establishments in Texas
The Woodlands, Texas